The 1964 United States Senate election in Indiana took place on November 3, 1964. Incumbent Democratic U.S. Senator Vance Hartke was re-elected to a second term in office over Republican D. Russell Bontrager.

General election

Candidates
D. Russell Bontrager, State Senator (Republican)
Vance Hartke, incumbent U.S. Senator since 1959 (Democratic)
Casimer Kanczuzewski (Socialist Labor)
J. Ralston Miller (Prohibition)

Results

See also 
 1964 United States Senate elections

References

Indiana
1964
1964 Indiana elections